Cartoon Sushi is an adult-animation showcase program that aired on MTV from 1997 to 1998. It was developed by Eric Calderon and produced by Nick Litwinko, and was the successor to Liquid Television. The title screen opening was illustrated by Ed, Edd n Eddy creator Danny Antonucci. Each episode featured internationally produced cartoons, along with some original material created for the show.

Animation Weekend

First pilot
 The Maxx Animation Weekend pilot by Sam Kieth
 The Adventures of Ricardo (1996) by Corky Quakenbush
 Buddy
 A Day in the Life of an Oscillating Fan by Neil Michka
 Chunk
 Iddy Biddy Beat Boy (1993) by Mo Willems
 Men Making Meetings
 Angry Cabaret by John R. Dilworth
 Slow Bob in the Lower Dimensions (1991) by Henry Selick

Second pilot
 The Maxx Animation Weekend pilot II by Sam Kieth
 The Adventures of Ricardo (1996) by Corky Quakenbush
 C'mon C'mon
 Another Bad Day for Philip Jenkins (1994) by Mo Willems
 Excuse Me
 Brickface and Stucco in Last Piece of Chicken
 The Food Mister by Neil Michka 
 Plastic Surgeon
 Joe's Apartment (1992) by John Payson
 B
 The Brothers Grunt - "To Hell with Bing"
 Brickface and Stucco in Sizzleans Machine

Episodes

First episode
 Ultracity 6060 - "No Lip Sync"  by Mike deSeve, Dave Hughes, Matt Harrigan
 Farcus by Gord Coulthart & David Waisglass
 Robin - "Partying" by Magnus Carlsson
 The Many Deaths of Norman Spittal - "Balloon Hanging" by Banx
 Pull My Finger by Jay Hathaway
 Science Facts! - "Broccoli Has an IQ of 10" by AMPnyc Animation
 Penguins: A Documentary by Frank Ziegler
 Cartoon Girl - "My Most Embarrassing Moment" by Heather McAdams & Chris Ligon
 Howl by Bardel Animation Limited
 The Many Deaths of Norman Spittal - "Helicopter"
 Ultracity 6060 - "Farting" by Mike deSeve, Dave Hughes, Matt Harrigan
 Space War by Christy Karacas, co-creator of Superjail!
 The Many Deaths of Norman Spittal - "Railroad"
 Untalkative Bunny pilot by Graham Falk

Second episode
 Howie Hurls - "Abducted" by Webster Colcord
 Science Facts! - "Dogs Can Not See Color!"
 Dirdy Birdy (Part 1) by John R. Dilworth, creator of Courage the Cowardly Dog
 Voice B Gone by David Wasson, creator of Time Squad
 Espresso Depresso by David Donar
 Fluffy by Doug Aberle
 Stupid for Love by Craig Valde
 Casting Call by Dominic Carola
 Science Facts! - "Fish Have No Memory"
 Robin - "Lonely" by Magnus Carlsson
 Dirdy Birdy (Part 2)

Third episode (Halloween special)
 The Sandman by Paul Berry
 Smile by Scott Alexander Storm
 Stick Figure Theater - "Mister Alfred Hitchcock" by Robin Steele
 Oddworld: Abe's Oddysee by Lorne Lanning
 Mad Doctors of Borneo by Webster Colcord
 Stick Figure Theater - "Night of the Living Dead" by Robin Steele
 Season's Greetings by Michael Dougherty

Fourth episode
 Man's Best Friend by Benjamin Gluck
 Dreamboy - "Kung Fu" by Christopher Dante Romano
 The Champ - "Snapper Bob" by Natterjack Animation Company
 The Many Deaths of Norman Spittal - "Mountain Hermit" by Banx and Bob Godfrey
 Day of the Monkey by Carlos Ramos
 The Many Deaths of Norman Spittal - "Mountain Top Balance"
 Celebrity Deathmatch - "Charles Manson vs. Marilyn Manson" by Eric Fogel
 Dreamboy - "Hair" by Christopher Dante Romano
 The Many Deaths of Norman Spittal - "Bed of Nails"
 Robin - "Sunglasses" by Magnus Carlsson
 Dreamboy - "Toilet" by Christopher Dante Romano
 Ultracity 6060 - "Planet Jackson" by Mike deSeve, Dave Hughes, Matt Harrigan

Fifth episode 
 When Animated Animals Attack by Abby Terkuhle and Mike de Seve
 Robin - "Uncle Harry" by Magnus Carlsson
 Call Me Fishmael by Steven Dovas
 Boris the Dog by Cevin Soling
 10,000 Feet
 Telekinesis
 King Sticko
 Rip-N-Glide by Happy Trails Animation
 Fast Driver by Nick Gibbons
 The Critics
 Smoking by Neil Ishimine

Sixth episode
 Broccoli's Taxicab Confrontations by AMPnyc Animation
 The Raven by John Fountain
 Nanna & Lil' Puss Puss - "Common Cents" by Keith Alcorn (DNA Productions)
 Genre by Don Hertzfeldt
 Incident at Palm Beach by Karl Staven & Derek Lamb
 Dogfishing by Joe Byrnes
 Billy Ray Shyster's House of Discount Special Effects by Paul Kevin Thomason
 Robin - "The Film Buff" by Magnus Carlsson
 Death Wears a Plush Jacket by Bob Mendelsohn
 Opposing Views by John Schnall

Seventh episode
 Movie Intro by Dan Coulston
 Killing Heinz by Stefan Eling
 Gabola the Great by Tim Cheung (Pacific Data Images)
 Robin - "Shopping" by Magnus Carlsson
 Where's the Bathroom by Sy Benlolo
 Love Stinks by Greg Holfeld
 Open Mic Fright by David Donar
 Fishbar - "Episode 1: Evil Babies in Colorado" by Honkworm International
 Sex & Violence by Bill Plympton
 "The Animal Lover"
 "Doctors Say Carrots Are Good For Eyesight"
 Celebrity Deathmatch - "Kathie Lee Gifford vs. Howard Stern" by Eric Fogel
 The Coolest Water Conditioner in the World by Keith Webster

Eighth episode
 Beat the Meatles by Tim Hatcher and Keith Alcorn (DNA Productions)
 Science Facts! - "The Mayfly Has a Lifespan of 2 Hours" by Michael Adams, Ted Minoff and Greg Pair
 Sex & Violence By Bill Plympton
 "A Person with Confused Priorities (Skydiver)" 
 "Husband and Wife"
 Ultracity 6060 - "Food Court" by Mike deSeve, Dave Hughes, Matt Harrigan
 Ye Ole Woodshop by Jesse Schmal
 Great True Moments in Rock & Roll History - "Jim Morrison" by Xeth Feinberg
 Sea Slugs by Adam Lane
 Sex & Violence
 "The Cheerleader"
 "Receding Hairline"
 "A Person with Confused Priorities (Driver)" 
 Performance Art Starring Chainsaw Bob by Brandon McKinney
 Zerox & Mylar by Joel Brinkerhoff
 Robin - "The Dentist" by Magnus Carlsson
 Frogg's Trip to the Sun by Keith Webster
 Sex & Violence
 "A Person with Confused Priorities (Sex)" 
 "Old Proverb: He Who Laughs Last Laughs Best"

Ninth episode 
 Nanna & Lil' Puss Puss - "One Ration Under God" by Keith Alcorn (DNA Productions)
 Great True Moments in Rock & Roll History by Xeth Feinberg
 Guy who needs to urinate invents the Pogo
 Monkees fans boo Jimi Hendrix off the stage
 Sex & Violence by Bill Plympton
 "The Lost Key"
 "Rollerblading"
 "The Beachcomber"
 "A Serious Alarm Clock"
 "Very Sexy Shoes"
 "What Are These People Doing?..."
 "After 30 Some Parts of the Body Continue to Grow"
 "A Dip in the Pool"
 "The New Extreme Sport..."
 Cartoon Girl - "Nothing I Like Better" by Heather McAdams and Chris Ligon
 Lily & Jim by Don Hertzfeldt

Tenth episode 
 Ultracity 6060 - "Bleep" written by Ben Gruber
 Great True Moments in Rock & Roll History - "Elvis Meets Nixon" by Xeth Feinberg
 Chunks of Life - "Rent" by Mike Mitchell and Chris Cole
 The Organization by Xeth Feinberg
 Fishbar - "Episode 2: The Swedish Connection"
 Love's Rich Bounty by Chris Garrison
 Cartoon Girl - "You Know You're Broke" by Heather McAdams and Chris Ligon
 Ultracity 6060 - "Ouch My Eyes" written by Ben Gruber
 Walking Around by Cesar Cabañas

Eleventh episode 
 Dream Date by Tom Megalis 
 Soda Pop Head by Tom Megalis 
 Pariah The Red Man by Kevin Richards
 Nanna & Lil' Puss Puss - "Who Calcutta The Cheese" by Keith Alcorn (DNA Productions)
 A Brief History Of Cinema by Tim Cargioli
 Awkward Stage by Jesse Schmal
 Burglar Alarm by Tom Megalis
 Elevator Guy by Tom Megalis

Unknown Shorts 
 Stroid '56 by Happy Trails Animation
 Cartoon Girl - "If I Was Single"
 Lou and Costa's Burglar Welcome Mat by Michael C. Schwab
 The Hippo by Susan Hurd

Special: A Special 1/2 Hour with Robin and Ben...
 Drafted
 The Bums
 Plastic Surgery
 Party with a Chair
 Frogman
 The Record Company
 Mooning

by Magnus Carlsson

Special: Bill Plympton Shorts 
 They Say When You Sneeze Your Heart Stops So What Would Happen If...
 Elvis
 After 30 Some Parts of the Body Continue to Grow
 The Truck
 The Toilet
 What Are These People Doing?...
 The Date
 Bad Camouflage
 Husband and Wife
 The Traffic Light
 A Dip in the Pool
 Why We Laugh
 The Lost Key

References

External links
 

1990s American adult animated television series
1990s American anthology television series
1990s American variety television series
1997 American television series debuts
1998 American television series endings
1990s Canadian adult animated television series
1990s Canadian anthology television series
1990s Canadian variety television series
1997 Canadian television series debuts
1998 Canadian television series endings
American adult animation anthology series
American adult animated comedy television series
Canadian adult animated anthology television series
Canadian adult animated comedy television series
MTV cartoons
DNA Productions television series
A.k.a. Cartoon
Television series created by Danny Antonucci